The fifth Minnesota Legislature first convened on January 6, 1863. The half of the 21 members of the Minnesota Senate who represented odd-numbered districts were elected during the General Election of October 8, 1861, while the 42 members of the Minnesota House of Representatives and the other half of the members of the Minnesota Senate were elected during the General Election of November 4, 1862.

Sessions 
The legislature met in a regular session from January 6, 1863 to March 6, 1863. There were no special sessions of the 5th Minnesota Legislature.

Party summary

Senate

House of Representatives

Leadership

Senate 
Lieutenant Governor
Ignatius L. Donnelly (R-Nininger)

House of Representatives 
Speaker of the House
Charles D. Sherwood (R-Elkhorn)

Members

Senate

House of Representatives

References 

 Minnesota Legislators Past & Present - Session Search Results (Session 5, Senate)
 Minnesota Legislators Past & Present - Session Search Results (Session 5, House)

05th
1860s in Minnesota